The 1940 AAA Championship Car season consisted of three races, beginning in Speedway, Indiana on May 30 and concluding in Syracuse, New York on September 2.  There was also one non-championship event in  Langhorne, Pennsylvania.  The AAA National Champion was Rex Mays and the Indianapolis 500 winner was Wilbur Shaw.

Schedule and results
All races running on Paved/Dirt Oval.

Leading National Championship standings

References

See also
 1940 Indianapolis 500

AAA Championship Car season
AAA Championship Car
1940 in American motorsport